Sociedade Esportiva Vila Aurora, commonly known as Vila Aurora, is a Brazilian football club based in Rondonópolis, Mato Grosso state. They competed three times in the Série D, and competed in the Copa do Brasil once.

History
The club was founded on May 5, 1964. Vila Aurora won the Campeonato Mato-Grossense Second Level in 1989, the Campeonato Mato-Grossense in 2005, and the Copa Governador do Mato Grosso in 2009. Vila Aurora competed in the Copa do Brasil in 2006, when they were eliminated in the First Round by Santa Cruz. The club competed in the Série D in 2009, and in 2010, when they were eliminated in the Quarterfinals by Guarany de Sobral. They competed in the 2011 Série D, when they were eliminated in the First Stage of the competition.

Achievements
Campeonato Mato-Grossense: 1
2005

Copa Governador do Mato Grosso: 1
2009

Campeonato Mato-Grossense Second Level: 1
1989

Stadium
Sociedade Esportiva Vila Aurora play their home games at Estádio Engenheiro Luthero Lopes. The stadium has a maximum capacity of 18,000 people.

References

Football clubs in Mato Grosso
Sport in Mato Grosso
1964 establishments in Brazil